Laurent Carnol (born 17 October 1989) is a Luxembourgish swimmer, who specialized in breaststroke events. Carnol set national records of 1:01.39 (100 m) and 2:09.78 (200 m) in the men's breaststroke at the 2010 European Aquatics Championships in Budapest, Hungary, and at the 2012 European Long Course Meet in Luxembourg City, respectively. Carnol is also a member of SC Le Dauphin Ettelbruck under his personal coach Ian Armiger, and currently, a chemistry student at Loughborough University in Leicestershire, England.

Carnol made his first Luxembourgian team, as a 19-year-old, at the 2008 Summer Olympics in Beijing. He qualified for the men's 200 m breaststroke by eclipsing a FINA B-cut of 2:17.29 from the European Championships in Eindhoven, Netherlands. Carnol challenged seven other swimmers on the second heat including three-time Olympian Jakob Jóhann Sveinsson of Iceland. He raced to third place by 0.29 of a second behind Sveinsson in his lifetime best of 2:15.87. Carnol failed to qualify for the semifinals, as he placed fortieth overall in the evening preliminaries.

Four years after competing in his last Olympics, Carnol qualified for his second Luxembourgish team, as a 23-year-old, at the 2012 Summer Olympics in London, by attaining an A-standard entry time of 2:09.78 (200 m breaststroke) from the European Long Course Meet in Luxembourg City. On the first day of the morning preliminaries, Carnol won the second heat of the men's 100 m breaststroke by nearly half a second (0.50) ahead of Serbia's Čaba Silađi, with a time of 1:01.46. His storming victory was not sufficiently enough to put him through the next round, as Carnol placed twenty-sixth out of 44 swimmers in the preliminary heats. In the 200 m breaststroke, Carnol recorded the twelfth fastest qualifying time of 2:10.83 to secure his place for the semifinals. Carnol fell short in his bid for the final, as he finished the semifinal run by 0.03 of a second behind New Zealand's Glenn Snyders in a second slowest time of 2:11.17. Achieving his best finish, Carnol became the first ever Luxembourgian swimmer to reach the semifinals at the Olympics.

He again competed for Luxembourg in both events at the 2016 Olympics.

References

External links
Player Bio – Loughborough University
NBC Olympics Profile

1989 births
Living people
Luxembourgian male swimmers
Olympic swimmers of Luxembourg
Swimmers at the 2008 Summer Olympics
Swimmers at the 2012 Summer Olympics
Swimmers at the 2016 Summer Olympics
Male breaststroke swimmers
People from Ettelbruck